John Randolph (June 2, 1773May 24, 1833), commonly known as John Randolph of Roanoke, was an American planter, and a politician from Virginia, serving in the House of Representatives at various times between 1799 and 1833, and the Senate from 1825 to 1827. He was also Minister to Russia under Andrew Jackson in 1830. After serving as President Thomas Jefferson's spokesman in the House, he broke with the president in 1805 as a result of  what he saw as the dilution of traditional Jeffersonian principles as well as perceived mistreatment during the impeachment of Samuel Chase, in which Randolph served as chief prosecutor. Following this split, Randolph proclaimed himself the leader of the "Old Republicans" or "Tertium Quids", a wing of the Democratic-Republican Party who wanted to restrict the role of the federal government. Specifically, Randolph promoted the Principles of '98, which said that individual states could judge the constitutionality of central government laws and decrees, and could refuse to enforce laws deemed unconstitutional.

Described as a quick-thinking orator with a remarkable wit, he was committed to republicanism and advocated a commercial agrarian society throughout his three decades in Congress. Randolph "attracted great attention from the severity of his invectives, the piquancy of his sarcasms, the piercing intonation of his voice and his peculiarly expressive gesticulation." Randolph's conservative stance, displayed in his arguments against debt and for the rights of the landed, slaveholding gentry, have been attributed to his ties to his family estate and the elitist values of his native Southside Virginia. His belief in the importance of a landed gentry led him to oppose the abolition of entail and primogeniture: "The old families of Virginia will form connections with low people, and sink into the mass of overseers' sons and daughters". Randolph vehemently opposed the War of 1812 and the Missouri Compromise of 1820; he was active in debates about tariffs, manufacturing, and currency. With mixed feelings about slavery, he was one of the founders of the American Colonization Society in 1816, to send free blacks to a colony in Africa. At the same time, he believed that slavery was a necessity in Virginia, saying, "The question of slavery, as it is called, is to us a question of life and death ... You will find no instance in history where two distinct races have occupied the soil except in the relation of master and slave." In addition, Randolph remained dependent on hundreds of slaves to work his tobacco plantation. However, he provided for their manumission and resettlement in the free state of Ohio in his will, providing money for the purchase of land and supplies. They founded Rossville, now part of Piqua, Ohio and Rumley, Ohio.

His supporters admire Randolph's fiery character, and education was one of his passions. On the other hand, others, particularly northern advocates of democracy, mocked Randolph for his eccentricities discussed below, as did many Virginians including Thomas Jefferson. He applied rousing methods in electioneering, which he also enjoyed as a hobby. Randolph appealed directly to yeomen, using entertaining and enlightening oratory, sociability, and community of interest, particularly in agriculture. This resulted in an enduring voter attachment to him. His defense of limited government appeals to modern and contemporary conservatives, most notably Russell Kirk, who wrote an influential monograph on Randolph.

Early life and education
Randolph was born at Cawsons (now in Hopewell) in the Colony of Virginia, the son of rich tobacco planter John Randolph (1742–1775) and Frances Bland (1744–1788). His families, the Randolph family of Virginia and the Bland family of Virginia, are both among the prominent First Families of Virginia and often intermarried. His grandfathers were Richard Randolph and Theodorick Bland of Cawsons, who were, respectively, the grandson and great-grandson of William Randolph and Mary Isham of Turkey Island. He was the first cousin once removed of both Richard Bland and Peyton Randolph, the two pillars of the First Continental Congress, the nephew of Congressman Theodorick Bland and stepnephew of Thomas Tudor Tucker, a half brother of Henry St. George Tucker, Sr. and Nathaniel Beverley Tucker, and a second cousin of Thomas Jefferson. Jefferson's mother was the daughter of Isham Randolph of Dungeness.

His father died in 1775, when he (the youngest of three brothers, and ultimately the longest-lived) was two years old. Their mother managed the family plantations and waited to remarry until 1778, when she wed St. George Tucker, the son of a prominent planter in Bermuda (where he later took his stepsons to recover their health), who had traveled to Virginia to study law under George Wythe in Williamsburg, was admitted to the Virginia bar in 1774, became well-regarded in his profession (including teaching law at the College of William and Mary) and would become a judge of what later became the Virginia Supreme Court in 1804. His maternal fourth great grandfather was Richard Bennett of Virginia, elected governor of Virginia colony during the Cromwell Protectorate and a Puritan who in 1672 was converted to the Quaker movement by George Fox.

Health issues
A genetic aberration — possibly Klinefelter syndrome — left him beardless and with a soprano prepubescent voice throughout his life.
Modern science has established that latent pulmonary tuberculosis can sometimes settle in the genital tract and can cause the symptoms and permanent damage that would prevent the onset of puberty. Randolph's brother died of tuberculosis, and it appears that Randolph contracted it as a youth and never went through puberty. He finally died of tuberculosis at age 60, after it broke out into the open. He began to use opium as a way to deal with the extreme pain caused by his lifelong battle with tuberculosis. Contemporary accounts attest to his having had a belligerent and bellicose personality before the onset of any disease.

Education
First studying under private tutors, Randolph attended Walker Maury's private school. After one of his brothers was disciplined, the Randolph brothers beat Maury and left the boarding school without completing their studies. Their stepfather then sent them to College of New Jersey, and Columbia College, New York City. The Randolph brothers neglected their studies and spent much time in taverns. After failing their courses and running out of money, they returned to Virginia. John later studied law in Philadelphia under his cousin Edmund Randolph, but never practiced. In 1792, his family's wealth and influence gained him admission to William and Mary College in Williamsburg, Virginia. Convinced that his pronunciations of words were the only correct ones, he insulted fellow student Robert B. for allegedly mispronouncing a word. Randolph refused to apologize and a duel ensued. Randolph soon after left William and Mary, thus ending his formal education.

Political career
At the unusually young age of 26, Randolph was elected to the Sixth United States Congress. It was said that Randolph's youthful appearance prompted the Speaker of the House, Theodore Sedgwick, to ask Randolph whether he was old enough to be eligible, but that Randolph's reply — "Ask my constituents" — disinclined Sedgwick to pursue the question further. Randolph was reelected to the six succeeding U.S Congresses, and served from 1799 to 1813. Even though he frequently criticized slavery, he devoted much of his congressional career to defending slavery and Virginia's class of wealthy slaveholders. While Randolph frequently criticized slavery, he also insisted that abolition would be worse for both enslaved blacks and whites. Indeed, Randolph lionized Virginia's wealthy slaveholding class as the rightful rulers of Virginia and the United States, and had great disdain for democracy and the advocates of more democratic government in Virginia and the Union.

Federalist William Plumer of New Hampshire wrote in 1803 of his striking presence:
Mr. Randolph goes to the House booted and spurred, with his whip in hand, in imitation, it is said, of members of the British Parliament. He is a very slight man but of the common stature. At a little distance, he does not appear older than you are; but, upon a nearer approach, you perceive his wrinkles and grey hairs. He is, I believe, about thirty. He is a descendant in the right line from the celebrated Indian Princess, Pochahontas. The Federalists ridicule and affect to despise him; but a despised foe often proves a dangerous enemy. His talents are certainly far above mediocrity. As a popular speaker, he is not inferior to any man in the House. I admire his ingenuity and address; but I dislike his politics.

Randolph was chairman of the Committee on Ways and Means in the Seventh through the Ninth Congresses, acting as the Democratic-Republican party leader. After breaking in 1806 with his cousin, President Thomas Jefferson, due to fall-out from the international reception to his ill-fated Mobile Act of 1804, he founded the Tertium quids, a faction of the Democratic-Republican Party that called for a return to the Principles of 1798 and renounced what it saw as creeping nationalism. Randolph's Teratium Quids believed that wealthy slaveholders like themselves were the rightful rulers of Virginia and the Union, and that any movement towards greater democracy would undermine the power and authority of Virginia's slaveholding class.

Although he greatly admired the political ideals of the Revolutionary War generation, Randolph, influenced by Southern anti-Federalism, propounded a version of republicanism that called for the traditional patriarchal society of Virginia's elite, slaveholding gentry to preserve social stability with minimal government interference. Randolph was one of the House managers who successfully prosecuted the impeachment trial of John Pickering, judge of the United States District Court for New Hampshire, in January 1804. Critics complained that he mismanaged the prosecution when he performed the same role during the failed impeachment effort the same year against Samuel Chase, Associate Justice of the Supreme Court of the United States.

Randolph had been a central proponent of impeaching Chief Justice Chase.

In June 1807, Randolph was the foreman of the Grand Jury in Richmond, which was considering the indictment of Aaron Burr and others for treason. By the end of the review, he was angry with Thomas Jefferson for supporting General James Wilkinson, Burr's chief accuser. He considered Wilkinson less than a reputable and honorable person.

Defeated for reelection in 1812 due to his opposition to the War of 1812, Randolph was elected in 1814 and 1816. He skipped a term, then was reelected and served from 1819 until his resignation in 1825. During the Missouri Crisis, Randolph emerged as an outspoken defender of the slaveholding gentry and a critic of democracy, even though he repeatedly insisted that he hated slavery.

In 1823–1824, John Randolph was asked to seek office as the Democratic-Republican Party candidate for the office of U.S. President in time for the 1824 U.S. presidential election. He declined this offer.

Randolph was appointed to the U.S. Senate in December 1825 to fill a vacancy, and he served until 1827. During his time in the Senate, his Whig colleagues, annoyed by the bitterness of his invective, sometimes foreshortened his speeches "by severally quitting their seats when he was speaking to an extent sufficient to leave the Senate without a quorum." Randolph was elected to the Congress again in 1826, becoming the Chairman of the Committee on Ways and Means.

In 1825, he talked for several days in opposition to a series of measures proposed by President John Quincy Adams; Randolph argued these measures would give advantage to the emerging industrial powers of New England at the expense of the Southern states. This series of speeches was the first Senate filibuster.

John Randolph offered many pro-slavery speeches over his long career in Congress. He mocked universal emancipation as an unreliable fantasy. Speaking about Cuba Randolph said, “It is unquestionable but this invasion will be made with this principle – this genius of universal emancipation – the sweeping anathema against the white population… And then, sir, what is the position of the southern United States?” If we should accede, “we should deserve to have negroes for our taskmaster’s, and for the husbands of our wives.“ (Fred Kaplan, John Quincy Adams, 407–8).

Randolph was a member of the Virginia Constitutional Convention of 1829-1830 at Richmond as a delegate from Charlotte County. He was appointed United States Minister to Russia by President Andrew Jackson and served from May to September 1830, when he resigned for health reasons.

Death, legacy and honors
Elected again in 1832, he served until his death in Philadelphia on May 24, 1833. He never married. Randolph is buried Hollywood Cemetery, Richmond, Virginia. His Virginia home, Roanoke Plantation, remains standing today, and was listed on the National Register of Historic Places in 1973.

Randolph was elected a member of the American Antiquarian Society in 1815.

A modern conservative political group, the John Randolph Club, is named after Randolph. His defense of limited government appeals to modern and contemporary conservatives, most notably Russell Kirk (1918–1994).

Places named in his honor include: 
Randolph-Macon College and Randolph College.
Randolph County, Arkansas, Randolph County, Georgia and Randolph County, Missouri
The World War II Liberty Ship  
Randolph-Henry High School, in Charlotte Court House, Virginia was named in his, and Patrick Henry’s honor. Established 1938.

Personality, eccentricity and outsider status
Despite being a Virginia gentleman, one of the great orators in the history of Caroline, and House leader, Randolph after five years of leadership became, by 1803, a permanent outsider. His personal eccentricities may have been made worse by his lifelong ill health (he died of tuberculosis), heavy drinking, and occasional use of opium. According to Bill Kauffman, Randolph was "a habitual opium user [and] a bachelor who seems to have nurtured a crush on Andrew Jackson."

John Greenleaf Whittier's poem "Randolph of Roanoke," written after the Virginian had become a symbol of "slave power," may capture his strange brilliance:

Mirth, sparkling like a diamond shower,
From lips of lifelong sadness;
Clear picturings of majestic thought
Upon a ground of madness
While others hailed in distant skies
Our eagle's dusky pinion,
He only saw the mountain bird
Stoop o'er his Old Dominion!
All parties feared him; each in turn
Beheld its schemes disjointed,
At right or left his fatal glance
And spectral finger pointed.

In March 1826, Randolph made a Senate speech in which he described the arrangement by which John Quincy Adams became president in 1825 and Henry Clay Adams's Secretary of State as the actions of the "puritan (Adams) with the blackleg (Clay)".  Clay was under the impression that Randolph had waived congressional immunity before his speech; insulted by Randolph's description of him, he challenged Randolph to a duel.  Randolph had in fact not waived immunity, but rather than appear dishonorable by making this known, he accepted Clay's challenge.  During the preliminary activities, Randolph asserted that Clay had no right to issue a challenge over political remarks made on the U.S. Senate floor.  Because of this view, Randolph announced his intention not to fire at Clay.  On April 8, they met on the Virginia side of the Potomac River.  During their first volley, Randolph shot wildly and Clay missed.  During their second, Randolph fired into the air, clearly signalling that he would not participate.  Clay then ended the duel by approaching Randolph and expressing hope that Randolph was uninjured.  Clay's bullet had torn Randolph's outer clothing, and he replied good-naturedly "You owe me a coat, Mr. Clay".  Civil relations between Randolph and Clay were restored.  As Martin Van Buren later wrote:

Except for this incident, Randolph generally saved his bellicosity for the floor of Congress. He routinely dressed in a flashy manner, often accompanied by his slaves and his hunting dogs. "[W]hen Clay had set about making the speakership a position of true power upon his first election to that post in 1811, he had unceremoniously ordered Randolph to remove his dog from the House floor—something no previous Speaker had dared to do."

Randolph had an intense dislike for Rep. Willis Alston and had a pitched fight with him in a Washington boarding house. Heated words led to the two throwing tableware at each other. Six years later, they fought again in a stairwell at the House after Alston loudly referred to Randolph as a "puppy". Randolph beat Alston bloody with his cane and the two had to be separated by other congressmen.  Randolph was fined $20 for this breach of the peace.

Nonetheless, Randolph maintained many friendships which crossed political party lines. As an example, he remained close with Federalist Congressman Harmanus Bleecker of Albany, New York.  Bleecker and Randolph exchanged portraits as a token of their mutual esteem, and each displayed in his home the portrait of the other.

Religious conversion
Randolph was raised and remained within the Episcopal Church. Although he went through a phase of youthful irreligion, in 1818 he had a crisis ending in a conversion experience, which he recounted in letters to several friends.

Randolph's life thereafter was marked with piety. For example, he wrote to John Brockenbrough that he was restrained from taking communion "by the fear of eating and drinking unrighteously." Thus, the executors of Randolph's last will and testament (described below) included Virginia's bishop, William Meade (who had freed his slaves years earlier, but would by the end of his life during the American Civil War become a defender of the "peculiar institution").

Slavery

Together with Justice Bushrod Washington and his former student Henry Clay, Randolph was among the founders of the American Colonization Society (ACS) in 1816. It began as a collaboration of slaveholders and abolitionists that planned to transport and resettle free blacks in a colony in Africa (this territory became Liberia). Like some other slaveholders, Randolph had long been opposed to slavery in theory. Also, his eldest brother, Richard Randolph, had freed slaves in his will, and his widow Judith fought to implement that provision, which led to the founding of the free black community of Israel Hill on the former Randolph estate in Prince Edward County, Virginia. In the two decades after the Revolutionary War, so many planters freed slaves that the proportion of free blacks in Virginia increased from less than one percent in 1782 to 13.5 percent in 1810.

Nearly two decades after Richard's death, in 1819, John Randolph also wrote a will providing for the manumission of his slaves after his death. He wrote, "I give and bequeath to all my slaves their freedom, heartily regretting that I have ever been the owner of one." Three years later, in 1822, in a codicil to that will (since these freed men unlike Richard's could not date their freedom before Virginia's law requiring freed blacks to leave the Commonwealth), Randolph stipulated that money be provided to transport and settle the freed slaves on land to be purchased in the free state of Ohio. Each slave above the age of 40 was to receive  of land. He provided for the manumission of hundreds of slaves in his will. Although the will was challenged in the courts, his slaves were ultimately ruled to be free. After a lengthy court case, his will was upheld. In 1846, 383 former "Randolph Slaves" arrived in Cincinnati, before settling in Rumley, Shelby County, Ohio. Many of them ultimately settled at Rossville near Piqua, Ohio, of which only the community cemetery remains.

Electoral history

1799; Randolph was elected to the U.S. House of Representatives with 40.54% of the vote, defeating Federalists Powhatan Bolling and Clement Carington.
1801; Randolph was reelected unopposed.
1823; Randolph was reelected unopposed.
1825; Randolph was reelected unopposed.
1827; Randolph was reelected unopposed.
1833; Randolph was reelected unopposed.

Cultural depictions
Portrayed by Melvyn Douglas in the 1936 film The Gorgeous Hussy.

Portrayed by Edwin Maxwell in the 1942 film Ten Gentlemen from West Point.

Edgar Allan Poe in "The Facts in the Case of M. Valdemar" (1845) states that the fatally consumptive M. Valdemar "is (or was) particularly noticeable for the extreme sparseness of his personhis lower limbs much resembling those of John Randolph". Poe might have seen Randolph while living in Richmond, Virginia, from 1820 to 1827.

Ancestry

See also

 List of United States Congress members who died in office (1790–1899)
 List of United States political appointments that crossed party lines
 Virginia Constitutional Convention of 1829-1830

Works
Randolph, John. Letters of John Randolph, to a Young Relative, 1834, 254 pp. (Available online.)
Randolph, John. Collected letters of John Randolph of Roanoke to Dr. John Brockenbrough, 1812–1833, edited by Kenneth Shorey; foreword by Russell Kirk, Piscataway, NJ: Transaction Publishers, 1988.

Notes

References

Bibliography
 Adams, Henry. John Randolph (1882); New Edition with Primary Documents and Introduction by Robert McColley, 1996, ; negative assessment. (Available online.)
 Bruce, William Cabell. John Randolph of Roanoke, 1773–1833; a biography based largely on new material, in 2 volumes; New York, London: G. P. Putnam's Sons, 1922 (2nd revised edition in 1 volume 1939, reprinted New York, Octagon Books, 1970); exhaustive details. (Available online: Vol. I, Vol. II.)
 Dawidoff, Robert. The Education of John Randolph, New York: Norton, 1979. 
 Devanny, John F., Jr. "'A Loathing of Public Debt, Taxes, and Excises': The Political Economy of John Randolph of Roanoke," Virginia Magazine of History and Biography 2001 109(4): pp 387–416.
 Garland, Hugh A. The Life of John Randolph of Roanoke; New York: Appleton & Company, 1851. (Available online: Vol. I, Vol. II.)
 Johnson, David. John Randolph of Roanoke (Louisiana State University Press; 2012) 352 pages; detailed scholarly biography
 Kauffman, Bill. Ain't My America: The Long, Noble History of Anti-War Conservatism and Middle-American Anti-Imperialism, Metropolitan, 2008.
 Kirk, Russell. Randolph of Roanoke; a study in conservative thought, (1951), 186 pp. Short essay; recent editions include many letters. (Available online.)
 John Randolph of Roanoke: a study in American politics, with selected speeches and letters, 4th ed., Indianapolis, IN : Liberty Fund, 1997, 588 pp. ; focus on JR's political philosophy
 Risjord, Norman K. The Old Republicans: Southern Conservatism in the Age of Jefferson (1965); the standard history of the Randolph faction.
 Tate, Adam L. "Republicanism and Society: John Randolph of Roanoke, Joseph Glover Baldwin, and the Quest for Social Order." Virginia Magazine of History and Biography 2003 111(3): 263–298.
 Weaver, Richard M. "Two Types of American Individualism," Modern Age 1963 7(2): 119–134; compares Randolph with Henry David Thoreau online edition

External links

 
 

1773 births
1833 deaths
People from Hopewell, Virginia
John
Bland family of Virginia
Bolling family of Virginia
American people of English descent
American people of Powhatan descent
American people who self-identify as being of Native American descent
American Episcopalians
Democratic-Republican Party members of the United States House of Representatives from Virginia
Jacksonian members of the United States House of Representatives from Virginia
Jacksonian United States senators from Virginia
Ambassadors of the United States to Russia
19th-century American diplomats
American duellists
American planters
American slave owners
American abolitionists
American colonization movement
Politicians from Richmond, Virginia
Princeton University alumni
Columbia College (New York) alumni
Members of the American Antiquarian Society
Burials at Hollywood Cemetery (Richmond, Virginia)
Christian abolitionists
Tuberculosis deaths in Pennsylvania
19th-century deaths from tuberculosis
United States senators who owned slaves